"Khuy Voyne" (also transliterated Hui Voine, etc.; , pronounced , English translation: "Fuck war") is a phrase developed by former t.A.T.u. producer Ivan Shapovalov during the duo's promotional tour in the USA in early 2003.
 
On February 25, 2003, the women performed on The Tonight Show with Jay Leno, and mocked NBC's insistence that they neither kiss nor comment on the Iraq War by performing "All the Things She Said" from their first English album 200 km/h in the Wrong Lane in white T-shirts that bore the slogan across the front, and by blocking their faces with their hands as they kissed during a break in their performance. The stunt prompted NBC to ban t.A.T.u. from any future performance, but it also helped their international record sales.

On February 26, when the shirts were banned from Jimmy Kimmel Live! and replaced with ones that said "Censored", they wrote the slogan on Jimmy Kimmel's hand. The two also wore the shirts to TRL on March 3 and Last Call with Carson Daly on March 5.

The documentary Anatomy of t.A.T.u. states that when the slogan was being created, Shapovalov said that it is a Russian slang way to say "No to War" (Нет войне!), however the slang translations may vary to "Dick to War" (word-by-word) or a creative way of saying "Fuck War".

Fans in Russia wore their own versions of the shirts at performances, but when shown on Russian TV, the shirts were edited with an extra stroke through the letter Х to say Жуй войне! literally "Chew to the War!".

Notes 

T.A.T.u.
Russian political phrases
2003 neologisms
Opposition to the Iraq War
Publicity stunts